The men's 1500 metres event at the 2000 World Junior Championships in Athletics was held in Santiago, Chile, at Estadio Nacional Julio Martínez Prádanos on 20 and 22 October.

Medalists

Results

Final
22 October

Heats
20 October

Heat 1

Heat 2

Heat 3

Participation
According to an unofficial count, 37 athletes from 32 countries participated in the event.

References

1500 metres
1500 metres at the World Athletics U20 Championships